John C. Tillman (born c. 1970) is an American lacrosse coach. He is currently the head coach for the University of Maryland Terrapins men's lacrosse team. He previously served as the head coach at Harvard University and as an assistant coach at the Naval Academy and Ithaca College.

Early life
A native of Corning, New York, Tillman served in the United States Navy as a fleet support officer. He attended college at Colgate University before transferring to Cornell University. Upon transferring, he changed his lacrosse position from goalkeeper to defensive midfielder. Tillman earned a varsity letter with the Colgate Raiders in 1988, and with the Cornell Big Red in 1991. He graduated from the Cornell University School of Hotel Administration in 1991.

Tillman played professionally in the National Lacrosse League for the Baltimore Thunder from 1997 to 1999 and the Washington Power in 2000. He also played at the amateur level for the Toyota Lacrosse Club, which won five consecutive Southern Division Championships and a world championship in 2000.

Coaching career
After graduating from college, Tillman worked as an assistant coach at Ithaca College from 1992 to 1995. Tillman then moved to the United States Naval Academy, where he served as an assistant and formulated the offensive game plans for the Midshipmen. In 2002, he was promoted to the position of Head Assistant Coach, and from 2004 to 2007, Navy was one of just five NCAA teams to qualify for the tournament each season. In each of those years, Navy also won both the Patriot League regular season and tournament championships. In 2004, Navy advanced to the NCAA tournament championship game before falling to Syracuse, 14–13.

Harvard
In September 2007, Harvard University hired Tillman as the Crimson's head coach. In his first season, Harvard finished with a 6–8 record and 1–5 against Ivy League competition. In 2009, Inside Lacrosse magazine ranked Harvard's incoming freshman class as the third-best in the nation. That year, the Crimson improved to an 8–5 record, including 3–3 in the Ivy League. In 2010, Harvard defeated sixth-ranked Princeton for the first time since 1990. The Crimson finished the season with a 6–6 record. He finished his tenure at Harvard with a 20–19 record.

Maryland
On June 15, 2010, Inside Lacrosse and The Baltimore Sun reported that the University of Maryland had hired Tillman to replace former head coach Dave Cottle. He was signed to a seven-year contract with a base salary of $150,000 per annum. Tillman stated that the long-term contract was the deciding factor in taking the job, rather than remain at Harvard. "I think what it showed me was that the administration at Maryland believed in me."

In his first season at Maryland, Tillman's Terrapins finished with a 13–5 record, the Atlantic Coast Conference tournament championship, and as national runners-up after a loss to Virginia in the NCAA championship game. Tillman inherited an experienced squad with 17 seniors from one of the highest ranked 2007 recruiting classes. Rather than overhaul the team, Tillman made minor adjustments to terminology and refocused the defensive scheme from man-to-man match-ups to team containment. During the postseason, Tillman remained in contact with his two predecessors at Maryland. He discussed his players and their personalities with former coach Dave Cottle, whom he invited to address the team after the regular season in which they lost to four underdog opponents. Tillman also consulted with Hall of Fame inductee Dick Edell, who led Maryland to three finishes as national runners-up. Edell, whose teams lost the championship game in 1995, 1997, and 1998 said, "I will counsel people on the semifinals. I don't have a useful thing to say about the final."

After the season, Navy expressed interest in hiring Tillman as replacement for retired head coach Richie Meade, but he elected to remain at Maryland.

Personal life
He is the brother of Mac and Tim Tillman.

References

External links
Q&A With John Tillman, Lax Magazine, September 2009.

1970s births
Living people
American lacrosse players
Colgate University alumni
Cornell Big Red men's lacrosse players
Navy Midshipmen men's lacrosse coaches
Maryland Terrapins men's lacrosse coaches
Harvard Crimson men's lacrosse coaches
People from Corning, New York
United States Navy officers
Cornell University School of Hotel Administration alumni